Monyetleng is a community council located in the Thaba-Tseka District of Lesotho. Its population in 2006 was 7,306.

Villages
The community of Monyetleng includes the villages of Bolia-'Mele, Botsola, Ha 'Mankereu, Ha Boomo, Ha K'henene, Ha Khanyetsi, Ha Komanyane, Ha Mokone, Ha Motake, Ha Motjolopane, Ha Motsoetsoe, Ha Rampeoane, Ha Seeiso, Ha Seelane, Ha Setala, Ha Teke (Hloahloeng), Ha Theko, Kh'olola, Khatoloto, Khochaneng, Khotsong, Kolobere, Lekhalong (Moreneng), Linotšing, Matsiring, Mokhoabong, Nokeng, Phahameng, Pontšeng and Taung.

References

External links
 Google map of community villages

Populated places in Thaba-Tseka District
Thaba-Tseka District